Writing material refers to the materials that provide the surfaces on which humans use writing instruments to inscribe writings. The same materials can also be used for symbolic or representational drawings. Building material on which writings or drawings are produced are not included. The gross characterization of writing materials is by the material constituting the writing surface (for example, paper) and the number, size, and usage and storage configuration of multiple surfaces (for example, paper sheets) into a single object (for example, a spiral notebook). Writing materials are often paired with specific types of writing instruments. Other important attributes of a writing material are its reusability, its permanence, and its resistance to fraudulent misuse.

History
Writing seems to have become more widespread with the invention of papyrus in Egypt. Parchment, using sheepskins left after the wool was removed for cloth, was sometimes cheaper than papyrus, which had to be imported outside Egypt. With the invention of wood-pulp paper, the cost of writing material began a steady decline.

Archaeology
Because drawing preceded writing, the first remains of writing materials are the stone walls of the caves on which the famous images were drawn. Another precursor was tally sticks used to record the count of objects or the passage of discrete units of time (days). Tally sticks have been found made of wood and of bone. Knotted ropes and similar materials were also used for tallies. Such materials did not take a great deal of preparation for their use for drawing or writing. Animal hides also had potential for use as a material for writing or drawing, although the drawings and writings may have been decorative or to convey status or religious meaning. Among the barks of trees, birch bark is very well suited for use as a writing material and was so used both in Northern Europe and among native peoples in North America.

Four other classes of material were sometimes used for writing: clay, wax, cloth, and metal. The value of metal for useful implements may have made it less than useful for practical writing and drawing. The very hardness of many metals that made them useful also made it an inconvenient material for many kinds of writing. But foils or sheets of soft metals like lead were usable. Lead sheets were used for curse tablets, as well as personal correspondence.

Cloth probably shared its mode of use with animal skins. Clay introduces the useful combination of extreme ease of making the inscription with the potential for rendering it fairly permanent. Unglazed pottery can readily accept inscription even after firing. Wax offers another novel combination of advantage: a reusable surface, easily inscribed and erased, and easy combination with materials like wood that give it durability. Stone tablets, clay and wooden writing tablets, and wax-covered wooden tablets are some of the first specialized configurations of materials in flat surfaces specifically for writing.

Unglazed pottery shards were used almost as a kind of scratch paper, as ostraka, for tax receipts, and, in Athens, to record the individual nominations of Greek leaders for ostracism.

The archaeological record contains either example of these materials used for drawing or writing or it has indirect indications of their use for writing, drawing, or tallying.

The Quipu or talking knots were recording devices fashioned from strings historically used by a number of cultures in the region of Andean South America. Knotted strings were used by many other cultures such as the ancient Chinese and native Hawaiians, but such practices should not be confused with the quipu, which refers only to the Andean device.

Common writing materials of the Middle Ages
In western civilizations, papyrus, which originated in 3,000 B.C.E. in Egypt, was later replaced by parchment made by treating animal hide, a process starting in the second century B.C. in the Mediterranean region A wide variety of parchments from various animal skins, with different textures, quality and hue were widely used for codices, religious and cultural texts. This was replaced by the advent and increasing access and availability of paper.

In eastern civilisations such as India, the principal writing media were birch bark or bhurjapatra (Sanskrit) and dried palm leaves. The use of paper began only after the 10th century. However, birch bark and palm leaf continue to be used even today on a limited scale in a rural milieu for the use of horoscopes, wedding invitations, and other cultural uses.

In China, the early material was animal bones, later silk, bamboo and wooden slips, until the 2nd century when paper was invented. The invention of paper is attributed to a eunuch of the imperial court called Cai Lun in 105 A.D. However, paper wasn't introduced to Europe for another thousand years following a battle in 751 A.D. where a few paper-makers were captured and thus the technology spread from Baghdad westward, only reaching Spain in the 12th century.

Paper 
Cai Lun used old rags, hemp, tree bark, and fishing nets to develop a method of paper-making fundamentally similar to that still used today.

The world of Islam acquired the art of papermaking in the 8th century, taught by Chinese prisoners who had been taken during eastward expeditions. Eventually, the Muslims brought papermaking to the Indian subcontinent and to Europe. Paper was at first called bagdatikos meaning "from Baghdad". The craft of paper making reached Spain in the twelfth century, and at subsequent hundred-year intervals arrived in Italy, Germany, and England. Yet for centuries after paper became widely available in Europe, vellum and parchment were preferred for documents that had to be long lasting. The basic ingredients of paper were linen and cotton, soaked in water and beaten into a smooth pulp, or slurry. As the pulp was drained through a wire screen, the slurry's interlocking fibers matted together, ready for the next step. First a press squeezed out water from the sheet, preparatory to drying; then, the application of a gelatin coating readied the sheet's surface for ink.  

In the late 18th century, paper was still made from cloth gathered by ragpickers. Wove Paper was invented by James Whatman and John Baskerville (1706-75). They created a way to produce perfectly smooth paper, using a fine wire mesh that left no lines from the mould on the page.

Electronic media
Electronic media have utilized the keyboard developed for the typewriter, electrical and electronic circuitry and storage devices, and the viewing screen developed for reading electronic signals to provide another form of writing material. The Palm Pilot was invented in 1996 and further changed the idea of electronic devices as writing materials. It was the first consumer product which allowed people to write directly on an electronic screen using a stylus, rather than having to input their writing using a keyboard.

See also
 Notebook
Desk pad

References

Further reading

 Harris, Roy (1985) The Origin of Writing. La Salle, IL: Open Court.
 Martin, Henri-Jean (1988) The History and Power of Writing, translated by Lydia G. Cochrane. Chicago: University of Chicago Press, 1994.

Writing
 
Textual scholarship